A referendum on a tax law was held in Liechtenstein on 27 April 1924. It was approved by 64.5% of voters.

Results

References

1924 referendums
1924 in Liechtenstein
Referendums in Liechtenstein
April 1924 events